A khaganate or khanate was a polity ruled by a Khan, Khagan, Khatun, or Khanum. That political territory was typically found on the Eurasian Steppe and could be equivalent in status to tribal chiefdom, principality, kingdom or empire.

Mongol-ruled khanates

Chagatai Khanate (1226–1347) 

After Genghis Khan established appanages for his family in the Mongol Empire during his rule (1206–1227), his sons, daughters, and grandsons inherited separate sections of the empire. The Mongol Empire and Mongolian khanates that emerged from those appanages are listed below.

In 1226, the second son of Genghis Khan, Chagatai Khan established the Chagatai Khanate. At its height in the late 13th century, the khanate extended from the Amu Darya south of the Aral Sea to the Altai Mountains in the border of modern-day Mongolia and China, roughly corresponding to the defunct Qara Khitai Empire. Initially the rulers of the Chagatai Khanate recognized the supremacy of the Great Khan, but by the reign of Kublai Khan, Ghiyas-ud-din Baraq no longer obeyed the emperor's orders.

Il-Khanate (1252–1335) 

In 1256, Il-Khanate was established by the grandson of Genghis Khan, Hulagu Khan. Its core territory lies in what is now part of the countries of Iran, Azerbaijan, and Turkey. At its greatest extent, the Ilkhanate also included parts of modern Iraq, Syria, Armenia, Georgia, Afghanistan, Turkmenistan, Pakistan, part of modern Dagestan, and part of modern Tajikistan. Later Ilkhanate rulers, beginning with Ghazan in 1295, converted to Islam. In the 1330s, the Ilkhanate was ravaged by the Black Death. Its last khan Abu Sa'id died in 1335, after which the khanate disintegrated. The Ilkhanid rulers, although of non-Iranian origin, tried to advertise their authority by tying themselves to the Iranian past, and they recruited historians in order to present the Mongols as heirs to the Sasanians (224–651 AD) of pre-Islamic Iran.

 List of Mongol khanates
 Bogd Khanate (1911–1924), under rule of the Bogd Khan, the last Mongol khagan
 Dzungar Khanate, formed in 1634, covering Xinjiang region of China, Kyrgyzstan, eastern Kazakhstan and western Mongolia; 2 December 1717 – 1720, also styled Protector of Tibet; 1755 tributary to the Qing dynasty, 1755 annexed by Qing dynasty
  Golden Horde 
 Blue Horde
 White Horde
 Kalmyk Khanate, established c.1630 by the Torghut branch of the Mongol Oirats, settled along the lower Volga River (in modern Russia and Kazakhstan), 1630-1771
 Kara Del
 Keraite Khanate
 Khamag Mongol Khanate
 Khoshut Khanate
 Khotgoid Khanate
 Mergid Khanate
 Moghul Khanate
 Naiman Khanate
 Qara Khitai (Western Liao dynasty)
 Rouran Khaganate
 Tatar Khanate
 Yuan dynasty
 Northern Yuan dynasty

Turkic khanates 
  First Turkic Khaganate
 Eastern Turkic Khaganate
 Second Turkic Khaganate
 Uyghur Khaganate
 Yenisei Kyrgyz Khaganate
 Xueyantuo
 Kara-Khanid Khanate
 Khazar Khaganate
 Turgesh Khaganate
  Golden Horde
 Cumania
 Pechenegs
  Old Great Bulgaria
 Volga Bulgaria, predecessor to the modern Chuvash Republic and the Chuvash people.
 First Bulgarian Empire, which started as a Turko-Slavic state, also known as Danube Bulgaria (in contrast to Volga Bulgaria, as both were established by members of the same Bulgar clan), but later became fully Slavicized and a Tsardom.
Keraite Khanate
Naiman Khanate
Tatar Khanate
Merkit Khanate

Central Asian Turkic khanates 

 Senior zhuz
 Middle zhuz
 Junior zhuz
 Astrakhan Khanate
 Besh Tau El
 Bukey Horde, Bokei or Buqei; also known as the Inner or Interior Horde –  This state founded in 1801 by Sultan Bukey under Russian suzerainty, and restyled as  the khanate of the Inner Horde in 1812. 5,000–7,500 families of Kazakhs from the Younger Kazakh Zhuz tribe settled between the Volga and Yaik (Ural) rivers. In 1845 the post of khan was abolished, and Russia took over the region
 Khanate of Bukhara
  Crimean Khanate
 
 Kyrgyz Khanate
 Karluk Khanate
 Khanate of Kashgaria – Kashgaria was founded in 1514 as part of Chagatai Khanate; in the 17th century it was divided into several minor khanates without importance, with real power going to the so-called Khwaja, Arabic Islamic religious leaders. It became the Yarkent Khanate which was annexed by the Dzungar Khanate in the Dzungar conquest of Altishahr in 1680
 Kazakh Khanate
  Khanate of Kazan – The Mongol term khan became active when the Genghisid dynasty was settled in Kazan Duchy in the 1430s; imperial Russia added to its titles the former Kazan khanate with the royal style tsar
 Kimek Khanate
  Kokand Khanate
 Kumul Khanate – a vassal state to Qing dynasty and Republic of China, abolished in 1930
 Maimana Khanate

  Nogai Khanate
 Oghuz Yabgu State
 Qasim Khanate (hence modern Kasimov) – named after its founder, a vassal of Moscovia/Russia
  Khanate of Sibir – source of the name Siberia, as the first significant conquest during Russia's great eastern expansion across the Urals
 The Khanate of Tuva near Outer Mongolia
 Uzbek Khanate
 Western Turkic Khaganate
 Yarkent Khanate

18th- to early-19th-century Khanates of the Caucasus in the Qajar Empire 

 Ardabil Khanate
 Baku Khanate
 Derbent Khanate
 Erivan Khanate
 Ganja Khanate
 Gazikumukh Khanate
 Javad Khanate
 Karabakh Khanate
 Karadagh khanate
 Khalkhal Khanate
 Khoy Khanate
 Kura Khanate
 Maku Khanate
 Maragheh Khanate
 Marand Khanate
 Nakhchivan Khanate
 Nishapur Khanate
 Quba Khanate
 Sarab Khanate
 Shaki Khanate
 Shamakhy Khanate
 Shirvan Khanate
 Tabriz Khanate
 Talysh Khanate
 Urmia Khanate

Manchu-ruled khanate 
 Later Jin dynasty – Later evolved into the Qing dynasty

Other khanates 
  Avar Khanate
 Avar Khaganate
  Khanate of Kalat

See also
 Rus Khaganate (not an actual Khanate but so named retroactively)
 Afsharid dynasty
 Beg Khan
 Orda (organization)
 Safavid dynasty
 Timurid dynasty

References

External links

 
Political systems
 
Anthropology
Islamic states by type